TAC - Tecnologia Automotiva Catarinense is an automotive corporation established by Adolfo Cesar dos Santos in 2004 in Joinville, Brazil. In the financial support of BNDES, the plant was opened after four years of construction on 13 March 2008. In collaboration with the Portuguese company Datasul, TAC finally developed the SUV TAC Stark. Most vehicle parts for the vehicle are of the Marcopolo S.A. owned subsidiary MVC Soluções em Plástico Ltda.

Currently the company manufactures only the four-wheel drive TAC STARK. As of 2012, the vehicle is to be available for export and also be available in other countries. About 1200 units are produced per year.

TAC was bought by Chinese Zotye in 2015.

Notes

External links
 TAC official site  
 TAC Stark page

Vehicle manufacturing companies established in 2004
Car manufacturers of Brazil
Companies based in Joinville
Brazilian brands